Jim Young (born April 21, 1935) is a former American football player and coach.  He served as the head coach at the University of Arizona (1973–1976), Purdue University (1977–1981), and the United States Military Academy (1983–1990), compiling a career college football record of 120–71–2. Young was inducted into the College Football Hall of Fame as a coach in 1999.

In addition to achieving a bowl game record of 5-1 (.833); Young was the interim coach for the Michigan Wolverines during the 1970 Rose Bowl, as Bo Schembechler was hospitalized following a mild heart attack.

Coaching career

Purdue
In December 1976, Purdue University hired a 41-year-old, Young away from Arizona. When Young arrived at Purdue, he named true freshman, Mark Herrmann as the team's starting quarterback, and the freshman lived up to expectations, throwing for 2,041 yards through the team's first eight games. Herrmann broke the NCAA record for passing yards (2,453) and passing touchdowns (18) for freshman. In 1978, Young lead Purdue to a 9–2–1 record, and a victory over Georgia Tech in the 1978 Peach Bowl. Young was named the Big Ten's Coach of the Year, the first Boilermaker head coach to ever win the award. Throughout his career, Herrmann would break the Big Ten's all-time career passing yards (6,734) and passing touchdowns (48) before his senior season. After a disappointing 1981 season, Young resigned from his position as head coach at Purdue, citing his desire to concentrate on athletic administration.

Head coaching record

College

References

External links
 

1935 births
Living people
American football fullbacks
Arizona Wildcats football coaches
Army Black Knights football coaches
Bowling Green Falcons football coaches
Bowling Green Falcons football players
Miami RedHawks football coaches
Michigan Wolverines football coaches
Purdue Boilermakers football coaches
High school football coaches in Ohio
College Football Hall of Fame inductees